The 2016 Colonial Athletic Association men's soccer season was the 34th season of men's varsity soccer in the conference.

Hofstra Pride are the defending regular season and tournament champions.

Teams

Stadia and locations 

 Towson does not sponsor men's soccer

Regular season

Rankings

Postseason

CAA tournament

NCAA tournament

All-CAA awards and teams

See also 
 2016 NCAA Division I men's soccer season
 2016 CAA Men's Soccer Tournament
 2016 Colonial Athletic Association women's soccer season

References 

 
2016 NCAA Division I men's soccer season